Jalan Siliau (Negeri Sembilan state route N6) is a major road in Negeri Sembilan, Malaysia.

List of junctions

Roads in Negeri Sembilan